Crenicichla adspersa is a species of cichlid native to South America. Found in the Amazon River basin and in the Guaporé River basin.

References

adspersa
Fish of the Amazon basin
Fish described in 1840
Taxa named by Johann Jakob Heckel